The Leotiomycetidae are a subclass of the fungal class Leotiomycetes.

Taxonomy
Order: Helotiales
Family: Ascocorticiaceae
Family: Bulgariaceae
Family: Cudoniaceae
Family: Cyttariaceae
Family: Dermateaceae
Family: Geoglossaceae
Family: Helotiaceae
Family: Hemiphacidiaceae
Family: Hyaloscyphaceae
Family: Leotiaceae
Family: Loramycetaceae
Family: Phacidiaceae
Family: Rutstroemiaceae
Family: Sclerotiniaceae
Family: Vibrisseaceae
Order: Lahmiales
Family: Lahmiaceae
Order: Medeolariales
Family: Medeolariaceae
Order: Rhytismatales
Family: Ascodichaenaceae
Family: Cryptomycetaceae
Family: Cudoniaceae
Family: Rhytismataceae
Order: Thelebolales